Štefan Kovalčík (15 May 1921 in Švábovce - 22 October 1973) was a Slovak cross-country skier who competed in the 1940s and in the 1950s. He was born in Švábovce and died in Bratislava.

In 1948 he finished 63rd in the 18km event. Four years later he competed again in the 18km event at the 1952 Winter Olympics in Oslo, but did not finish.

External links
18 km Olympic cross country results: 1948-52

1921 births
1973 deaths
Slovak male cross-country skiers
Czechoslovak male cross-country skiers
Olympic cross-country skiers of Czechoslovakia
Cross-country skiers at the 1948 Winter Olympics
Cross-country skiers at the 1952 Winter Olympics
People from Poprad District
Sportspeople from the Prešov Region